Zavoleh or Zavaleh may refer to:
Zavoleh-ye Olya
Zavoleh-ye Sofla